Anthony Joseph Coleman (born October 6, 1982) is an American former professional basketball player and current assistant coach for the University of Colorado Boulder. He played professionally for the Akita Northern Happinets of the Japanese bj league. On November 11, 2010, he set his career high in points in a Japanese bj League game. That day he scored 14 points in Akita Northern Happinets's home loss against Tokyo Apache, 87–99.

He entered the coaching field as an assistant for the Arizona State Sun Devils. In 2019, he moved within the Pac-12 Conference to the Colorado Buffaloes.

College statistics

|-
| style="text-align:left;"| 2001–02
| style="text-align:left;"| Xavier
|  ||  ||  ||  ||  || ||  ||  ||  ||  ||
|-
| style="text-align:left;"| 2002–03
| style="text-align:left;"| Xavier
| 5 || 0 || 6.8 || .333 || 1.000 || .000|| 1.00 ||0.00  || 0.20 || 0.40 || 0.06
|-
| style="text-align:left;"| 2003–04
| style="text-align:left;"| LBS
| 2 || 1 || 26.0 || .278 || .222 || .750|| 7.00 ||2.00  || 1.00 || 1.00 || 7.50
|-
| style="text-align:left;"| 2004–05
| style="text-align:left;"| LBS
| 17 || 8 || 21.4 || .437 || .237 || .643|| 5.00 ||0.65  || 0.18 || 0.82 || 8.24
|-
|- class="sortbottom"
! style="text-align:center;" colspan=2|  Career

!24 ||9 || 18.7 ||.414  || .250 ||.652  || 4.33 ||0.62  || 0.25 ||0.75  || 6.58
|-

Career statistics

NBA Summer League Stats

|-
| align="left" | 2006–07
| align="left" | LAC
|1 ||0 || 10.0 ||.000  || .000 ||1.000  || 1.00 || 0.00 || 0.00 ||0.00  ||2.00
|-
| align="left" | 2007–08
| align="left" | MIL
|2 ||0 || 8.5 ||.750  || .000 ||.000  || 1.50 || 0.50 || 0.50 ||0.50  ||3.00
|-
|- class="sortbottom"
! style="text-align:center;" colspan=2|  Career

!3 || 0 || 9.0 ||.600  || .000 ||1.000  || 1.33 ||0.33  || 0.33 ||0.33  || 2.67
|-

Regular season 

|-
| align="left" | 2005–06
| align="left" | Albuquerque
|4 ||  || 7.5 ||.375  || .000 ||.000  || 1.8|| 0.5 || 0.0 ||0.3  ||1.5
|-
|-
| align="left" | 2007–08
| align="left" | Braunschweig
|30 ||1 || 14.9 ||.412  || .327 ||.741  || 2.70 || 0.37 || 0.30 ||0.33  ||4.47
|-
| align="left" | 2008–09
| align="left" | LAD
|9 ||9 || 31.3 ||.397  || .000 ||.615  || 5.44 || 1.78 || 0.44 ||1.56  ||7.33
|-
| align="left" | 2010–11
| align="left" | Akita
|19 ||11 || 22.7 ||.370  || .167 ||.634  || 7.4 || 0.5 || 0.7 ||0.6  ||5.6
|-
| align="left" | 2011–12
| align="left" | LAD
|6 ||1 || 5.6 ||.600  || .000 ||.000  || 0.67 || 0.00 || 0.00 ||0.50  ||1.00
|-

References

1982 births
Living people
Akita Northern Happinets players
Albuquerque Thunderbirds players
American expatriate basketball people in Germany
American expatriate basketball people in Japan
American men's basketball coaches
American men's basketball players
Arizona State Sun Devils men's basketball coaches
Bakersfield Jam players
Basketball coaches from California
Basketball Löwen Braunschweig players
Basketball players from California
Colorado Buffaloes men's basketball coaches
Long Beach State Beach men's basketball players
Los Angeles D-Fenders players
Xavier Musketeers men's basketball players